Bobby Martin (November 3, 1987 – April 28, 2020) nicknamed "Bobby No Legs”, was born with Caudal regression syndrome. As he had no legs or hips, he used his arms to run. A graduate of Colonel White High School in Dayton, Ohio, he played defensive lineman for his high school varsity team. He later attended Central State University.

Biography
During his 2005 high school senior season, he was removed from play at half-time in a game against Mount Healthy High School by officials claiming he was in breach of league rules requiring players to wear thigh pads, knee pads and shoes. Colonel White High School was later told by the Ohio High School Athletic Association that this decision was incorrect and Martin was allowed to continue to finish the season. He finished the season with 48 tackles. At halftime of one game, he was named the Homecoming King. On July 12, 2006, Martin won the ESPY award for Best Male Athlete with a Disability.

After graduation, Martin studied marketing at Central State University and did not play football. In 2007, then Cleveland Browns head coach Romeo Crennel invited Martin to a practice. After seeing wide receiver Dennis Northcutt evade player after player, Martin approached Northcutt and claimed that he could tackle him. At the insistence of teammate Braylon Edwards, Northcutt allowed Martin to challenge him. During the run, Martin hung with Northcutt for 20 yards before forcing him out at the one-yard line.

After Martin's playing days, he had several run ins with police for various crimes. On April 28, 2020, Martin died when he crashed an ATV he had stolen earlier that evening.

References

External links
Boston Globe article

1987 births
2020 deaths
High school football players in the United States
American football defensive linemen
American disabled sportspeople
People with caudal regression syndrome
Road incident deaths in Ohio
Players of American football from Dayton, Ohio